Homonoia riparia, the willow-leaved water croton, a mangrove species, belongs to the genus Excoecaria of the family Euphorbiaceae. The plant is widely distributed through South Asian and South East Asian countries such as Cambodia, China, Indonesia, Laos, Papua New Guinea, Philippines, Sri Lanka, Taiwan, Thailand and Vietnam. It is grown in wet soil near river banks and flooded plains.

Description
 Bark - brownish
 Leaves - simple, and alternate
 Flowers - wind pollinated monoecious flowers and bracts sub-ovate
 Height - 1–3-metre-tall evergreen shrub
 Ecology - A rheophyte
 Uses - medicine

Common names
The names are according to Asian Plant.net and Indian Flowers

Borneo - Bongai tidong, Parang-parang
Burma - Kyauk(a)naga, Momaka, Nyin ye bin.
Cambodia - Rey tuck.
China - Shui liu, shui yeung mui.
English - Willow-Leaved Water Croton.
India 
Hindi - Sherni (शेरनी)
Marathi - Raan kaner (रान कणेर)
Tamil - Kattalari (காட்டலரி)
Malayalam - Neervanchi, Puzhavanchi
Telugu - Adavi ganneru (అడవి గన్నేరు)
Kannada - Hole nage, Niru kanigalu (ಹೊಳೆ ನಗೆ)
Sanskrit - Kshudrapashanabheda (क्षुद्रपाषाणभेद)
Java - Kajoe soebah, Keding djati, Soebah/Sobah,
Laos - Kek khay.
Philippines - Agooi, Agoioi, Agukuk, 
Thailand - K(l)ai nam, Klai hin, Mai kerai, (Ta)kri nam.
Sri Lanka - Omi (ඕමි), Werawala (වැරවල)
Sumatra - Sangka, Sangkir
Vietnam - Cây rù rì nước, Rì rì, Rù rì.

References

http://wwwuser.gwdg.de/~hlaatsc/181_Homonoia.pdf

Further reading

External links
 Asianplant.net:  Homonoia riparia

Acalypheae
Flora of China
Flora of tropical Asia